Francis Henry Shell (2 January 1912 – 1988) was an English professional footballer who played in the Football League for Aston Villa and Mansfield Town.

References

1912 births
1988 deaths
English footballers
Association football forwards
English Football League players
Barking F.C. players
Aston Villa F.C. players
Birmingham City F.C. players
Hereford United F.C. players
Mansfield Town F.C. players
Stafford Rangers F.C. players
Hinckley Athletic F.C. players